Layal Watfeh (born February 14, 1980) is a Syrian composer, musician, and voice actor. Watfeh's work primarily consists of original film score for commercials, television, and film. Over two decades of work, Watfeh has won numerous international awards for her voice acting and original scores for television and film. Her style incorporates symphonic, orchestral tones as well as traditional Arab sounds. She has worked with major companies composing commercial music, including past clients such as Olay, T.G.I. Friday's, and Krispy Kreme. Besides recording music, she has also been a voice on many TV networks across the Middle East, such as MBC2, MBC4, OSN, Abu Dhabi TV, DMTV. Watfeh currently lives in Dubai.

Early life 
Watfeh was born in Damascus, Syria, where she began exploring her interest in music at a young age. She entered the music conservatoire in Damascus to learn the violin at nine years old., though later that year moved to Dubai with her family.  At 11, she turned her attention to the piano for two years, and by 17 Watfeh was recording voice-overs for TV and radio commercials. After working in numerous music studios in Dubai, Watfeh began composing original music.

Career
Watfeh's career in music began in 2002 when MBC Group offered her a job as a post-production sound engineer, sound designer, and music composer. Watfeh accepted the job, and after six years she was named the senior manager of her branch. Meanwhile, Watfeh was active in the music industry as she sang the lead vocals with Abali on their album "Lemonada"" in 2004.

Watfeh left MBC in 2009 to create her own studio and begin composing music. She was drawn to a variety of media, including advertisements, TV series, documentaries, short films, and feature films, and she found work across the Middle East, the United States, Canada, and the UK. Watfeh was invited to Berlinale Talents 2014 in Berlin, Germany; she was one of approximately 300 invitees that year

In 2016, Watfeh signed a contract with scoreAscore in Los Angeles as a composer, where she has been writing scores for various American companies.

Awards

Television and filmography

References

External links 

 

Living people
1980 births
Syrian composers
Syrian voice actresses